Phoxinus  jouyi is a species of freshwater fish in the family Cyprinidae. It is endemic to Japan. It may be a subspecies of Phoxinus oxycephalus.

References

Phoxinus
Taxa named by David Starr Jordan
Taxa named by John Otterbein Snyder
Fish described in 1901